Oxford is an unincorporated community located in Scott County, Kentucky, United States. It was also known as Marion.

References

Unincorporated communities in Scott County, Kentucky
Unincorporated communities in Kentucky